Melanella  dubusi is an extinct species of sea snail, a marine gastropod mollusk in the family Eulimidae. .

References

External links
 Cossmann M. & Pissarro G. (1902). Faune éocénique du Cotentin (Mollusques). 3e Article. Bulletin de la Société Géologique de Normandie. 21: 27-181
 Pacaud J.M. & Le Renard J. (1995). Révision des Mollusques paléogènes du Bassin de Paris. IV- Liste systématique actualisée. Cossmanniana. 3(4): 151-187

dubusi